The HKL Class M300 is a class of metro trains operated by Metropolitan Area Transport Ltd in use on the Helsinki Metro. 20 four-carriage trains were built between 2014 and 2016 by Construcciones y Auxiliar de Ferrocarriles for the Länsimetro extension. In November 2019, HKL announced the purchase of five additional trains, delivered in 2022.

It is planned to automate the M300 trains, however as of  the trains have temporary driver cabs.

Accidents and incidents 
 On 27 July 2016, M100 carriage no. 157 was involved in an accident with M300 unit no. 302 when the latter derailed near Itäkeskus metro station during testing.

See also 

 Helsinki Metro
 Helsinki City Transport
 HKL Class M100
 HKL Class M200

References

External links 
 

Helsinki Metro
Multiple units of Finland